
Penwortham Old Bridge is a toll-free, five-span bridge over the River Ribble at Preston, Lancashire, England. A Grade II listed structure and a Scheduled monument, located about a mile southwest of the centre of the city, it crosses the river to Penwortham. Today the bridge no longer carries motorised traffic.

The original attempt to build a bridge here was completed in 1755, but collapsed the following year.

The bridge is built in stone and consists of five unequal segmental arches, rising toward the centre. The cutwaters rise to form refuges at the sides of the carriageway. The spandrels are of red sandstone. The parapets curve to form walls on the south side, extending approximately  eastwards and  westwards.

On the northern side a sixth arch, aligned almost at a right angle to the main part of the bridge, carries the approach road from the west. Opening in 1759, until the early 20th century this was lowest bridged crossing over the Ribble. Its costs have at times been funded by a toll.

The bridge was Grade II listed in two stages, the part at the southern end (then within the Preston Rural District) on 1 October 1962, and remaining part (in Preston) on 27 September 1979. It has also been listed as a Scheduled Monument.

See also
 Listed buildings in Preston, Lancashire
 Scheduled monuments in Lancashire

References

Citations

Sources

External links

Grade II listed buildings in Lancashire
Scheduled monuments in Lancashire
Bridges across the River Ribble
Stone bridges in England
Road bridges in England
Grade II listed bridges
Buildings and structures in Preston